Clinique Chiva is a hospital in Tevragh-Zeina, Nouakchott, Mauritania. It is located south of the Stade olympique, immediately west of the Mosque Tevragh Zeina.

References

Nouakchott
Hospitals in Mauritania